Alejandro Balboa Bandeira (born 6 March 2001), known as Álex Balboa, is a professional footballer who plays as a midfielder for Segunda División club Deportivo Alavés. Born in Spain, he represents the Equatorial Guinea national team.

Early life
Balboa was born in Vitoria-Gasteiz to Equatoguinean parents. His maternal grandfather is originally from São Tomé and Príncipe.

Club career
Balboa is a Deportivo Alavés product. He has played for Club San Ignacio in Spain.

International career
Balboa made his senior debut for Equatorial Guinea on 7 September 2021.

Career statistics

International

Personal life
Balboa's cousin is former Real Madrid CF footballer Javier Balboa, who also played for the Equatorial Guinea national football team.

References

External links

2001 births
Living people
Citizens of Equatorial Guinea through descent
Equatoguinean footballers
Association football midfielders
Equatorial Guinea international footballers
Equatoguinean people of São Tomé and Príncipe descent
Footballers from Vitoria-Gasteiz
Spanish footballers
Deportivo Alavés B players
Tercera División players
Segunda División B players
Spanish sportspeople of Equatoguinean descent
Spanish people of São Tomé and Príncipe descent
Spanish sportspeople of African descent
2021 Africa Cup of Nations players